The Karmapa (honorific title: His Holiness the Gyalwa Karmapa, more formally as Gyalwang Karmapa, and informally as the Karmapa Lama) is the head of the Karma Kagyu, the largest sub-school of the Kagyu, itself one of the four major schools of Tibetan Buddhism. Karmapa was Tibet's first consciously incarnating lama.

The historical seat of the Karmapas is Tsurphu Monastery in the Tolung valley of Tibet. The Karmapa's principal seat in exile is the Dharma Chakra Centre at Rumtek Monastery in Sikkim, India. His regional monastic seats are Karma Triyana Dharmachakra in New York and Dhagpo Kagyu Ling in Dordogne, France.

Due to a controversy within the Karma Kagyu school over the recognition process, the identity of the current 17th Karmapa is disputed by some. See Karmapa controversy for details.

Origin of the lineage
Düsum Khyenpa, 1st Karmapa Lama (1110–1193), was a disciple of the Tibetan master Gampopa. A talented child who studied Buddhism with his father from an early age and who sought out great teachers in his twenties and thirties, he is said to have attained enlightenment at the age of fifty while practicing dream yoga. He was henceforth regarded by the contemporary highly respected masters Shakya Śri and Lama Shang as the Karmapa, a manifestation of Avalokiteśvara, whose coming was predicted in the Samadhiraja Sutra and the Laṅkāvatāra Sūtra.

The source of the oral lineage, traditionally traced back to the Buddha Vajradhara, was transmitted to the Indian master of mahamudra and tantra called Tilopa (989-1069), through Naropa (1016–1100) to Marpa Lotsawa and Milarepa. These forefathers of the Kagyu (Bka' brGyud) lineage are collectively called the "Golden Rosary".

Recognition of the Karmapa

The Karmapa is a long line of consciously reborn lamas, and the second Karmapa, Karma Pakshi (1204–1283), is the first recognized tulku in Tibetan Buddhism that predicted the circumstances of his rebirth.

A Karmapa's identity is confirmed through a combination realized lineage teachers supernatural insight, prediction letters left by the previous Karmapa, and the young child's own self-proclamation and ability to identify objects and people known to its previous incarnation.

Conflicts in recognitions

The 8th, 10th, and 12th incarnations, as well as the widely renowned 16th Karmapa, each faced conflicts during their recognition, which were ultimately resolved. There is currently a controversy over the enthronement of two 17th Karmapas.

Black Crown
The Karmapas are the holders of the Black Crown and are thus sometimes known as "the Black Hat Lamas". This crown ( "self-arisen crown"), is traditionally said to have been woven by the dakinis from their hair and given to the Karmapa in recognition of his spiritual realization. The physical crown displayed by the Karmapas was offered to Deshin Shekpa, 5th Karmapa Lama by the Yongle Emperor of China as a material representation of the spiritual one.

The crown was last known to be located at Rumtek Monastery in Sikkim, the last home of the 16th Karmapa, although that location has been subject to some upheaval since 1993 causing some to worry as to whether or not it is still there. An inventory of items remaining at Rumtek is purported to be something the Indian government is going to undertake in the near future.

List of previous Karmapas
 Düsum Khyenpa (1110–1193)
 Karma Pakshi (1204–1283)
 Rangjung Dorje (1284–1339)
 Rolpe Dorje (1340–1383)
 Deshin Shekpa(1384–1415)
 Thongwa Dönden (1416–1453)
 Chödrak Gyatso (1454–1506)
 Mikyö Dorje (1507–1554)
 Wangchuk Dorje (1556–1603)
 Chöying Dorje (1604–1674)
 Yeshe Dorje (1676–1702)
 Changchub Dorje (1703–1732)
 Dudul Dorje (1733–1797)
 Thekchok Dorje (1798–1868)
 Khakyab Dorje (1871–1922)
 Rangjung Rigpe Dorje (1924–1981)
 Ogyen Trinley Dorje (b. 1985) or Trinley Thaye Dorje (b. 1983)

See also
Dorje Pakmo
Drikungpa
Shamarpa
Thrangu Rinpoche

Notes

References
 Official websites of His Holiness Karmapa www.karmapa.org or www.kagyuoffice.org 
 Thinley, Karma: The History of the Sixteen Karmapas of Tibet, Boulder, Prajna Press 1980.
 Douglas, Nick; White, Meryl: Karmapa, the Black Hat Lama of Tibet, Milano 1975.
 Ken Holmes, Karmapa, Altea Publishing 1995, . Author's website (While the book and web site favours one candidate for the 17th the information on 1st-16th is useful and was the original source for this article)

External links 

The history of the Karmapa lineage, including biographical details of the historical Karmapas, can be found at the following web sites. Notice that the websites are written to those loyal to one or other of the rival 17th Karmapas, and their accounts of previous incarnations may not be written from a neutral point of view.
 Karmapa lineage history on kagyuoffice.org, the website of Ogyen Trinley Dorje
 Karmapa lineage history on karmapa.org, the website of Thaye Dorje
 The Life of the 16th Gyalwa Karmapa
 Information on past and present Karmapas from khandro.net, a website supporting Ogyen Trinley Dorje

 
Avalokiteśvara
Bodhisattvas
Karma Kagyu lamas
Karma Kagyu tulkus
Tibetan Buddhist titles
Tulkus